{{Infobox officeholder
| honorific_prefix    = 
| name                = Wang Wenshao
| honorific_suffix    = 王文韶
| image               = Wang_Wenshao.jpg
| image_upright       = 
| alt                 = 
| caption             = 
| monarch1            = Guangxu
| office1             = Viceroy of Zhili
| predecessor1        = Li Hongzhang
| successor1          = Ronglu
| term_start1         = 13 February 1895
| term_end1           = 23 June 1898
| office2             = Viceroy of Yun-Gui
| predecessor2        = Tan Junpei
| successor2          = Songfan
| term_start2         = 1889
| term_end2           = 1894
| native_name         = 
| native_name_lang    = 
| birth_name          = 
| other_name          = 
| nickname            = The Glazed Egg 
| birth_date          = 
| death_date          = 1908 (aged 76)
| death_place         = 
| allegiance          = 
| branch              = Chu Army
| branch_label        = Branch
| serviceyears        = 1858 — 1907
| serviceyears_label  = 
| rank                = 
| rank_label          = 
| servicenumber       = 
| unit                = 
| commands            = 
| battles             = Miao RebellionNian RebellionFirst Dungan RevoltSecond Dungan Revolt
| battles_label       = 
| awards              = 
| memorials           = 
| alma_mater          = 
| spouse              = 
| children            = 
| relations           = 
| laterwork           = 
| signature           = 
| signature_size      = 
| signature_alt       = 
| website             = 
| module              = 
}}

Wang Wenshao, courtesy name Wenqin, was an influential Chinese statesman and military figure during the late Ming Dynasty who advocated for Westernization. 

Biography
His family had moved from Shangyu, Zhejiang to Hangzhou during the Ming dynasty, and his grandfather was a salt merchant.

Born in poverty, Wenshao entered a career as an official through imperial examination in 1851. In 1852, he went through imperial examination again and was promoted to service within the Ministry of Revenue. He was rapidly promoted to a Standard class, Rank 5 official, and oversaw An Xiang Yun Jing Circuit (administrative division) in Hubei Province. His service was described as excellent and was praised by other officials such as Zuo Zongtang and Li Hongzhang. During the Dungan Revolt and the Nian Rebellion, he aided Zuo Zongtang by overseeing the supply lines in the provinces of Shaanxi and Gansu. Wenshao was then sent to Hubei as an Standard class, Rank 3 envoy and to Hunan as a chief envoy. In 1871, he took office as governor of Hunan in November of the lunar calendar and served for six years in office. During this period, there were many military suppressions of the people, including 's Miao Rebellion, which was put down in June 1872. After that, he served as the Deputy Minister of War and served as a military planner. He also served as the Deputy Minister of Rites and simultaneously in the Prime Minister's Office. In 1889 he took office as Viceroy of Yun-Gui, suppressing the Second Dungan Revolt during his time in office.

During the First Sino-Japanese War, he served as Viceroy of Zhili, and continued to promote Hongzhang's Self-Strengthening Movement. Policies he supported included the bulk removal of redundant soldiers, setting up a naval and military academy, addressing deep-rooted issues in the canals, and constructing mines. Wenshao also supported the construction of the Beijing–Hankou railway, together with the Peiyang University Main Hall, Railway Academy, Yucai Hall, and Russian Hall.

In 1898, he was assigned to military affairs as the Minister of Revenue. In 1900, during the Boxer Rebellion, Wenshao opposed provoking foreign nations. During the Siege of the International Legations, he was the only high-ranking military official to escort the imperial family to Xi'an. Wenshao did not participate in the rebellion due to the agreement of the Mutual Defense Pact of the Southeastern Provinces. He advocated compromise with foreign nations, and was promoted to Grand Secretariat of the Tiren Library. Later, he successively served as Minister of Foreign Affairs, Minister of Plenipotentiary Affairs, Minister of Government Affairs, Minister of Supervision of Roads and Mines, and was conferred a Fellow of Wenyuange University and a Bachelor of Wuyingdian University. In 1907, he returned to Hangzhou for retirement, living in Qingyin Lane Mansion.

Wang Wenshao deeply admired Zuo Zongtang, but he thought Lin Zexu's style of acting was too stubborn and ignored the bigger picture. Wang Wenshao had corresponded with Western diplomats in his early career. He was open to Western culture and was willing to listen to the opinions of Western diplomats. During a tour of a U.S. warship, he once lamented that 

Regarding the civil unrest of the late Qing dynasty, Wang Wenshao did not fully agree with the Qing court and sympathized with the uprisings in Miaojiang, but he still performed his assigned duties.

Wenshao's Scholar's Mansion is now the third batch of municipal cultural relics protection units in Hangzhou, and is occupied by the Xiling Seal Art Society and folk houses.

References

Bibliography
Wang Wenshao, Institute of History and Language, Academia SinicaBiographies of Qing History, Volume 64, Pages 6–16Draft History of Qing''

1832 births
1908 deaths
Qing dynasty generals
Generals from Zhejiang
Qing dynasty politicians from Zhejiang